The 2020 NBL1 season was due to be the second season of NBL1, and the first season utilising the conference system after the Queensland Basketball League (QBL) and Premier League (South Australia) joined the league during the off-season. The season was scheduled to begin on March 14 for the Central Conference, April 18 for the South Conference and April 24 for the North Conference, however the COVID-19 pandemic forced the start of the season to be delayed, and later cancelled.

Background 
After a successful first season, the NBL1 announced in October 2019 that it would be expanding into Queensland for the 2020 season. In January 2020, NBL1 expanded with the establishment of North and South conferences for the 2020 season. After a landmark agreement with Basketball Queensland, NBL1 North replaced the Queensland Basketball League (QBL). As a result, the 2019 NBL1 teams formed the new South Conference. The following month, NBL1 expanded into South Australia with an identical agreement with Basketball South Australia for NBL1 Central to replace the Premier League.

After the National Basketball League (NBL) was forced to close its doors for their Grand Final series and later cancel games due to the COVID-19 pandemic, the NBL1 were forced to delay the start of the season.

On 24 March 2020, it was announced that the season would be cancelled due to the coronavirus pandemic.

Clubs

South Conference Clubs

North Conference Clubs

Central Conference Clubs

References 

2020
2019–20 in Australian basketball
2020–21 in Australian basketball
Basketball events cancelled due to the COVID-19 pandemic